The United Democratic Party (abbr. UDP) is a political party in the Gambia, founded in 1996 by 3 political parties (the then-banned PPP, NCP and GPP) and choose the human rights lawyer, freedom fighter, ANM Ousainou Darboe to be the party leader and Secretary General. As a candidate in the presidential election of 18 October 2001, he came second with 32.6% of the popular vote; he took second place again in the 22 September 2006 presidential election with 26.7% of the vote. The 17 January 2002 parliamentary election was boycotted by the party. In the 25 January 2007 parliamentary election, the party won four out of 48 seats.

After Darboe was jailed in April 2016 for his political activities in opposition to the ruling government of Yahyah Jammeh and his Alliance for Patriotic Reorientation and Construction party, the previous UDP deputy treasurer Adama Barrow was selected as its leader and candidate for the 2016 presidential election. The UDP then became part of the opposition alliance known as Coalition 2016, a group of seven political parties, and the Coalition endorsed Barrow as its candidate. Barrow officially resigned from the party to allow him to run as a formally independent candidate endorsed by the Coalition. Barrow then won the election in a surprise victory. When Jammeh refused to accept the election result, he was forced from office by a regional military intervention, and when Barrow won the election, Darboe was released from prison.

In the 2021 election, the party once again backed Ousainou Darboe who lost the election and received 27.7% of the vote.

In the 2022 National Assembly election, the party won 15 of the 53 available seats.

Electoral history

Presidential elections

National Assembly elections

References

Political parties established in 1996
Political parties in the Gambia
United Democratic Party (Gambia) politicians
Consultative member parties of the Socialist International